Pseudanophthalmus tenuis is a species of ground beetle in the family Carabidae. It is found in North America.

Subspecies
These five subspecies belong to the species Pseudanophthalmus tenuis:
 Pseudanophthalmus tenuis blatchleyi Barr, 1960
 Pseudanophthalmus tenuis jeanneli Krekeler, 1958
 Pseudanophthalmus tenuis morrisoni Jeannel, 1931
 Pseudanophthalmus tenuis stricticollis Jeannel, 1931
 Pseudanophthalmus tenuis tenuis (G.Horn, 1871)

References

Further reading

 

Trechinae
Articles created by Qbugbot
Beetles described in 1871